Brenda Mallory may refer to:

 Brenda Mallory (artist) (born 1955), Native American artist and a member of the Cherokee Nation
 Brenda Mallory (public official) (born 1957), American lawyer and government official